Untitled is an abstract 1990 sculpture by Joel Shapiro. Bronze edition 4/4 is installed in the Lillie and Hugh Roy Cullen Sculpture Garden, as part of the collection of the Museum of Fine Arts, Houston. Another bronze copy is installed on the Seattle University campus.

See also
 List of public art in Houston

References

1990 sculptures
Abstract sculptures in the United States
Bronze sculptures in Texas
Bronze sculptures in Washington (state)
Lillie and Hugh Roy Cullen Sculpture Garden
Outdoor sculptures in Seattle
Seattle University campus